Willi Kaltschmitt Luján (born 13 August 1939) is a Guatemalan businessman, sports administrator, and former ambassador.

He was ambassador to Cuba from 1998 to 2000. 

He was  a member of the executive board of the International Olympic Committee (IOC) since 2012 and became an IOC Honorary Member at the end of 2019, as per protocol, as he turned 80 during the year. 

He is also a member of the World Baseball Softball Confederation executive board.

References

1939 births
Ambassadors of Guatemala to Cuba
Guatemalan referees and umpires
International Olympic Committee members
Living people
Guatemalan people of German descent